John Van Lear Findlay (December 21, 1839 – April 19, 1907) was a U.S. Representative from Maryland.

Biography
Born at Mount Tammany, near Williamsport, Maryland, Findlay was privately tutored, pursued classical studies, and graduated from Princeton College in 1858.
He served as member of the Maryland House of Delegates in 1861 and 1862.  He studied law, was admitted to the bar, and commenced practice in Baltimore, Maryland, in 1869.
He served as collector of internal revenue for the third district of Maryland at Baltimore in 1865 and 1866, and was appointed city solicitor for Baltimore in 1876 and served two years.
He was orator for Maryland on "Maryland Day" at the United States Centennial Exhibition of 1876.

Findlay was elected as a Democrat to the Forty-eighth and Forty-ninth Congresses (March 4, 1883 – March 3, 1887).  He resumed the practice of law, and was appointed a member of the Venezuelan Claims Commission in 1889, and nominated as arbitrator on the Chilean Claims Commission in 1893, but the Senate rejected the nomination.  He died in Baltimore, Maryland, April 19, 1907, and was interred in Greenmount Cemetery.

Family
Findlay was a nephew of U.S. Senator William Findlay's son John King Findlay.

References

1839 births
1907 deaths
Princeton University alumni
Maryland lawyers
Democratic Party members of the Maryland House of Delegates
Democratic Party members of the United States House of Representatives from Maryland
19th-century American politicians